Wellhausen is a village and former municipality in the canton of Thurgau, Switzerland.

In 1983 the municipality was merged with the neighboring municipality Felben to form a new and larger municipality Felben-Wellhausen.[cleanup rewrite]

Former municipalities of Thurgau
Villages in Switzerland